Richard Saunders is an Australian skeptic, podcaster and professional origamist. He received recognition by the Australian Skeptics with a Life Membership in 2001, and has twice served as their president. He founded Sydney Skeptics in the Pub. He has presented on skepticism, represented the Australian Skeptics on television and radio shows, and is the co-host of The Skeptic Zone podcast.

Early life
Saunders was born in Kurri Kurri, New South Wales, Australia, and lived in Tribune, Saskatchewan in 1968 and 1969, as his father R. H. Saunders, who was a reverend, was posted there. Returning to Australia, Saunders attended a variety of primary schools in Mullumbimby, Lithgow, and graduated from Woy Woy High School in 1984.

Professional career

Web design
After graduating from high school, Saunders joined educational publisher Ashton Scholastic and sold educational software for Apple II and Commodore 64 home computers. He also worked as a web designer for The Advance Bank of Australia and Commonwealth Bank and in 1999 was transferred to EDS, where he designed the interface for netBank online banking and worked for two years before joining GreenStone Pty Ltd as a web designer for three years.

Acting
Saunders works as a part-time actor and a film and TV extra, appearing in the background in such feature films as Superman Returns and Australia as well as in the background in the TV shows All Saints and Home and Away.

In 2013 he was invited to be a member of the "World Competition Jury" at Academia Film Olomouc's 48th International Festival of Science Documentary Films or AFO48 in the Czech Republic. He also gave a lecture on the claims of water divining as part of the "Pseudoscience" block and a lecture and workshops on origami as part of the "Beauty of Numbers" block.

Origami
In 1988 Saunders began authoring over twenty books on origami, which subsequently were featured on the Australian children's television program Wombat, The Afternoon Show, and similar programs.

In 2008 Saunders and Gary Clark produced DVD Origami, an instructional DVD with step-by-step instructions on how to fold 20 paper models.

Saunders has used his skills in origami to design an origami Pigasus in honour of the mascot of the James Randi Educational Foundation.  He authored instructions for folding the Pigasus and a dragon for Skeptic magazine. He also recorded a YouTube instructional video of the Pigasus.

Professional skeptic

Saunders has over 10 years of experience researching claims of the paranormal. As a teenager he was inspired by Channel 7's Great Mysteries of the World with Scott Lambert; he was surprised at just how easily people could fool themselves, even after being shown evidence that they may be wrong. A TV documentary called James Randi in Australia was another great skeptical influence on Saunders. He joined the committee of the Australian Skeptics in 2001 and has been president and vice president of the organization.  He was granted a Life Membership in the organization in recognition of his work on The Great Skeptic CD. He went on to create the Great Water Divining DVD and the "card carrying skeptic card".  He founded Sydney Skeptics in the Pub, initiated The Skeptic Tank radio show on Net.FM with Stefan Sojka, produced The Australian Skeptics collection on "Theories of Everything" for TVS local Sydney TV, and created several of the Australians Skeptics convention DVDs.  He was the acting artistic director and layout manager for The Skeptic Magazine from Australian Skeptics until Tim Mendham was appointed the new editor in June 2009.

In 2003 Saunders co-founded Mystery Investigators with Alynda Brown and Ian Bryce. The program teaches students to use science and critical thinking to investigate claims of the paranormal, such as water divining, spoon bending, and firewalking. In 2008 Brown left the show and was replaced by biologist Rachael Dunlop.  In 2013 the show celebrated 10 years of performing.

In 2010 he helped organize the first The Amaz!ng Meeting Australia in Sydney. The meeting featured presentations by several high-profile members of the skeptical community, including James Randi, Brian Dunning, and Eugenie Scott.

Public & media appearances
Saunders has made many appearances on radio and television in his role as a skeptic, including on Today Tonight, Sunrise, Radio 2GB, Radio 2UE, Nova 106.9, 702 ABC, and the pilot show for Curiosity Aroused.  In 2007 he did a recurring segment for the Mike Williams Saturday Night Live radio program called Myths and Mysteries. In 2011 and 2012 he was a regular on The Dirty Disbelievers, a radio program on the Australian Broadcasting Corporation radio network.

In July and August 2008 (series #1) and in 2011 (series #2), Saunders appeared as the resident skeptic judge on The One, an Australian reality television program on the Seven Network that tested the powers of several alleged psychics.

Saunders has spoken at many skeptic meetings including the Australian Skeptics National Convention in 2003, 2004, and 2008. In the United States he appeared at The Amaz!ng Adventure North to Alaska in 2007, and The Amaz!ng Meeting 6 and the Skeptrack at Dragon*Con, both in 2008.

Saunders produced the Vaccination Chronicles in 2014. The film is a 30-minute documentary collects first-hand anecdotes about the horrors faced by parents of recent generations, when many saw their children die from diseases which are now preventable with vaccines.

Podcasting

Saunders was producer and host of The Tank Vodcast (aka The Skeptic Tank). In 2008 this podcast became The Skeptic Zone podcast, which released its 500th episode on 19 May 2018. It is produced weekly and is billed as "The Podcast from Australia for Science and Reason". Saunders has produced every episode of The Skeptic Zone podcast.

Saunders has also appeared as a guest on many other podcasts and vodcasts including The Skeptics' Guide to the Universe, Skepticality, Dragon*Pod, The Reason Driven Podcast, The Amateur Scientist Podcast, Bad Psychics TV, and Meet The Skeptics!.

Great Australian Psychic Prediction Project
In 2020 Saunders assembled an international team of skeptics to help him complete a project he had been working on since at least 2018, dubbed the "Great Australian Psychic Prediction Project". In addition to Saunders, the team includes Adrienne Hill, Michelle Bijkersma, Rob Palmer, Leonard Tramiel, Paula Lauterbach, Louis Hillman, Wendy Hughes, Angie Mattke, Kelly Burke and Susan Gerbic. As of March 21, 2021, the project encompassed 3224 predictions, with approximately 650 yet to be evaluated.

The project's goal is to collect and determine the accuracy of every psychic prediction published in Australia since 2000. Predictions primarily concern Australia, and the topics include politics, scandals, celebrities, natural disasters, real estate trends, sports, and weather patterns. A minority of predictions concern events outside of Australia. Saunders said that the project "has the opportunity to show us that there are indeed some people who can peer into the future". However, reporting on the interim results for one category, horse racing, Saunders reported that "the overall results are not great for those who claim to see into the future and from what we have gathered so far, I wouldn’t be placing any bets based on their mystical advice."

Adrienne Hill also reflected on the absence of any prediction concerning the historic event that transpired on January 6, the 2021 storming of the United States Capitol, which the team watched unfold. She wrote, "Isn’t it amazing that this event is nowhere to be found in the ponderings of those who claim to be able to predict the future?"

Apart from Psychics being wrong, it is interesting how many major events were not predicted.  These include 9/11 and the COVID-19 Pandemic.

Awards and honours
 2001 Made "Life Member" of Australian Skeptics, Inc.
 2011 Made CSI Fellow (Committee for Skeptical Inquiry)

List of publications 

 
 
 
 
 
 
 
 
 
 
 
 
 
 
 
 
 
 
 
 
 
 
 
  Review of the Australian Paranormal & Spiritual Expo, Oct 2014.
  Review of the Australian Paranormal & Spiritual Expo, Oct 2014.

See also
 Scientific skepticism

References

External links

 The Skeptic Zone homepage

Living people
Australian podcasters
Origami artists
People from New South Wales
Australian sceptics
Year of birth missing (living people)